Fairfield High School is a public high school located in Fairfield, Texas (United States) and is part of the Fairfield Independent School District which serves students in central Freestone County and classified as a 3A school by the UIL.  In 2019, the school was rated "exemplary performance" by the Texas Education Agency.

Athletics
The Fairfield Eagles compete in these sports - 

Volleyball, Cross Country, Football, Basketball, Powerlifting, Track, Baseball & Softball

State titles
Fairfield (UIL)

Girls Track - 
1992 (3A), 1993 (3A)

Girls' Basketball
2020 (4A), 2022(3A)

State finalists 
Fairfield (UIL)

Football
2013 (3A/DII)

Girls' Basketball
2021 (3A), 2023 (3A)

Fairfield Dogan (PVIL)
 
Boys Basketball - 
1957(PVIL-1A), 1958(PVIL-1A), 1963(PVIL-2A)

Alumni 

 former NFL long snapper Brandon Hartson
former NFL defensive end Tony Brackens

References

External links
Fairfield ISD

Schools in Freestone County, Texas
Public high schools in Texas